Sarra Belhocine (born September 18, 1994 in Algiers) is an Algerian volleyball player. She played on the Algerian women's volleyball team in the 2012 Summer Olympics.

Clubs
  current club :  GSP (ex MC Alger)

References

1994 births
Living people
Algerian women's volleyball players
Volleyball players from Algiers
Olympic volleyball players of Algeria
Volleyball players at the 2012 Summer Olympics
Opposite hitters
21st-century Algerian people